King's Matriculation Higher Secondary School is located in Madipakkam, a southern suburb of Chennai, Tamil Nadu, India. It is located in the center of the town.

History
It was started by Mrs.Mangalam, wife of Mr.G.Kothandaraman in 1984 in the name of "Kings Convent". In 1988, the school was renamed as "King's Matriculation School". Recently, Mr. Kothandaraman received the "Jewel of India" award for his continuous service to the students.

Academics
The school is affiliated with the Matriculation Board of Tamil Nadu and the State Board of Tamil Nadu. The samacheer Kalvi is introduced from June 2012 as per Tamil Nadu educational board. The grade 11 standard Common Examination comes under the control of the Kancheepuram District Board of Education.

References
King's Educational Society Minutes book

High schools and secondary schools in Chennai
Educational institutions established in 1984
1984 establishments in Tamil Nadu